IL-23 or IL 23 can refer to:
 Interleukin 23, a protein
 Illinois's 23rd congressional district, an obsolete district
 Illinois Route 23